The San Marcos Stakes is an American Grade III Thoroughbred horse race held annually in late January or early February at Santa Anita Park in Arcadia, California. Open to horses aged four and older, it is raced on turf over a distance of one and one-quarter miles.

Inaugurated in 1952 as a one-mile race on dirt, in 1954 it was changed to one and one-quarter miles and became Santa Anita Park's first graded stakes race on turf. It was raced on dirt again in 1956, 1962, 1969, 1973, 1975, 1978 through 1983, and in 1996.

Run as handicap prior to 2000, it is now raced under allowance weight conditions, with specified weight reductions for horses who meet certain conditions. It was open to three-year-olds and up from 1955 through 1959. There was no race held in 1970 and for 1978 it was set at a distance of 1 and one-eighth miles.

Records
Time record:
 1:57.92 – Johar (2003)

Most wins:
 2 – Slim Shadey (2012, 2013)

Most wins by an owner:
 2 – El Peco Ranch (1961, 1972)
 2 – Elmendorf Farm (1976, 1982)
 2 – Trudy McCaffery & John Toffan (1994, 2001)
 2 – David and Jill Heerensperger (2009, 2011)

Most wins by a jockey:
 6 – Bill Shoemaker (1958, 1959, 1967, 1971, 1975, 1977)

Most wins by a trainer:
 8 – Charles Whittingham (1963, 1969, 1971, 1975, 1977, 1981, 1984, 1985)

Winners of the San Marcos Stakes

References

* Run in two divisions in 1972.

Horse races in California
Santa Anita Park
Open middle distance horse races
Graded stakes races in the United States
Turf races in the United States
Horse races established in 1952
1952 establishments in California